This is a list of township-level divisions of the province of Yunnan, in the southwest of the People's Republic of China (PRC). After province, prefecture, and county-level divisions, township-level divisions constitute the formal fourth-level administrative divisions of the PRC. The types of townships in Yunnan include subdistricts, ethnic townships,  and towns.

B 

 Bajie Subdistrict

C 

 Caopu Subdistrict

D 

 Dajie, Jiangchuan County
 Daqiao Township, Huize County
 Daqiao Township, Shiping County

H 

 Hongqiao Subdistrict, Xuanwei
 Hongqiao Township, Yunnan
 Huaxi, Yunnan

J 

 Jiantang
 Jinfang Subdistrict
 Jiucheng Township, Yunnan
 Jiucheng, Honghe
 Jiucheng, Weixin County
 Jiucheng, Yingjiang County

K 

 Kunyang Subdistrict

L 

 Lajing Town
 Lianran Subdistrict
 Liqi Subdistrict
 Lubiao Subdistrict
 Lucheng, Yunnan
 Luoji Township, Shangri-La
 Luokan, Yunnan

M 

 Manhao
 Mohan, Yunnan

Q 

 Qionglong Subdistrict, Anning, Yunnan

S 

 Shijie Yi Ethnic Township
 Shuangjiang, Eshan County

T 

 Taiping New City Subdistrict

W 

 Wenquan Subdistrict, Anning, Yunnan
 Wenquan Township, Yunnan

X 

 Xiaguan, Dali City
 Xiangyang Township, Yunnan
 Xianjie Subdistrict
 Xichuan Township
 Xinhua Township, Pingbian County
 Xinhua Township, Tengchong County
 Xinhua Township, Yuanmou County
 Xinhua Yi and Miao Ethnic Township
 Xinhua, Wenshan
 Xinqiao, Yunnan

Y 

 Yingpan, Lanping County
 Yuezhou Town

References

 
Townships
Yunnan